Richard Wilson ( – 1815) was an Irish-born politician whose origins are obscure.

He was Member of Parliament (MP) in the Parliament of Great Britain for Barnstaple from 1796 to 1802.

He married Anne, daughter of Charles Townshend. They were divorced in 1798. Lady Louisa Stuart wrote of his elopement with Anne Townshend that:
...this Mr Wilson - whose name, when known, made nobody the wiser - was an Irishman, born to an inheritance of three hundred a year, but greatly in debt, of no profession, accounted a black-leg, and chiefly remarkable for having fought two or three duels... His conversation was bragging and his manner familiar and aisy like those of the Paddy in a farce. All his friends had ten thousand a year; he talked of his horses and carriages, his estate and his interest; and when he addressed you as a lady, you could not help drawing back for fear he should give you a kiss.

He died, laden with debts, sometime in 1815. He had 3 sons, one of whom died in the West Indies, and 2 daughters.

References 

1750s births
1815 deaths
Members of the Parliament of Great Britain for Barnstaple
British MPs 1796–1800
Members of the Parliament of the United Kingdom for Barnstaple
UK MPs 1801–1802